This list of museums in Monaco contains museums which are defined for this context as institutions (including nonprofit organizations, government entities, and private businesses) that collect and care for objects of cultural, artistic, scientific, or historical interest and make their collections or related exhibits available for public viewing.

See also
 :Category:Visitor attractions in Monaco
 List of museums

References

 Visit Monaco – Museums

 
Monaco
Monaco-related lists
Monaco

Lists of organisations based in Monaco